United States gubernatorial elections were held on November 4, 2008, in 11 states and two territories. Prior to the election, eight of the total seats were held by Democrats and five by Republicans. Two governors were prohibited by term limits from seeking re-election in 2008. The only governorship to change party was the open seat in Missouri, which was won by a Democrat after being previously held by a Republican.

These elections coincided with the presidential election, as well as the elections of the United States Senate and the United States House of Representatives and many local elections, state elections, and ballot propositions.

Results by state

States

Territories

Closest races
States where the margin of victory was under 5%:
 North Carolina, 3.39%

States where the margin of victory was under 10%:
 Washington, 6.45%

Blue denotes states won by Democrats.

Delaware

Ruth Ann Minner was term-limited in 2008.  As of 2008, Democrats had controlled the Delaware governorship for 16 years. In an upset, state Treasurer Jack Markell defeated Lieutenant Governor John Carney by 51 to 49% for the Democratic nomination on September 9. The Republican nominee was former state Superior Court Judge William Swain "Bill" Lee, defeating airline pilot Michael Protrack. Lee was the Republican nominee for governor in 2004, and lost to Minner by a narrow margin.

The race got more attention due to the vice presidential candidacy of U.S. Senator Joe Biden.  Since Biden, a senator, was elected to be Vice President, he needed to resign his Senate seat. The new governor was then called upon to appoint someone to replace Biden in the Senate. Since Lee would naturally have been more inclined to select a Republican, his election could have caused a Republican pickup in the Senate by proxy. However, he was defeated by a wide margin on election day by Markell. Senator Biden resigned his seat in the United States Senate on January 15, 2009, and Governor Minner appointed Ted Kaufman to Biden's seat. Kaufman had previously served as Senator Biden's Chief of Staff during his tenure in the United States Senate.

Indiana

Incumbent Republican Mitch Daniels faced Democratic nominee former Congresswoman and Undersecretary of Agriculture Jill Long Thompson, and Libertarian nominee engineer Andy Horning, who also ran for governor in 2000.

Some pundits thought Mitch Daniels was vulnerable in 2008, but polling taken by SurveyUSA on October 21 and 22, 2008 showed him with a significant 54-35 lead. He won re-election easily, confirming these predictions.

While Indiana had not voted Democratic for president since 1964, Daniels was the first Republican elected governor in 16 years there. Daniels was also endorsed by the state's largest newspapers, the Indianapolis Star, the Evansville Courier & Press, the Fort Wayne Journal Gazette, the Times of Northwest Indiana, the Gary Post-Tribune and the Louisville Courier-Journal.

Missouri

Matt Blunt was considered to be the most vulnerable incumbent in the 2008 election cycle, but decided on January 22, 2008 not to seek re-election.  Blunt's approval rating was the nation's second-lowest after Governor Ernie Fletcher of Kentucky for much of 2007, though his approval rating improved and approached 50% in a May poll conducted by SurveyUSA.

The Republican nominee was Congressman Kenny Hulshof. The Democratic nominee was four-term Missouri Attorney General Jay Nixon, who ran unsuccessfully for the U.S. Senate in 1998. Nixon defeated Hulshof comfortably, despite the fact that Missouri ultimately voted for John McCain, a Republican, for president. Missouri was the only state not to re-elect the incumbent party for governor in 2008.

Montana

Democrat Brian Schweitzer of Montana (running with Lt. Governor John Bohlinger) was heavily favored to win re-election as he had better funding and high approval ratings as current Governor. The Republican nominee was State Senator Roy Brown (running with Steve Daines), and the Libertarian nominee was Stan Jones (running with Michael Baker).  Schweitzer won some press coverage with his well-received speech to the 2008 Democratic National Convention. He was criticized, however, for a speech in July in which he jested that he helped defeat U.S. Senator Conrad Burns in 2006 by tampering with the vote totals, which he insisted was purely a joke. Schweitzer won re-election by a comfortable margin despite the criticism.

New Hampshire

In New Hampshire, Democrat John Lynch easily won re-election against State Senator Joseph D. Kenney, the Republican nominee.

NOTE: New Hampshire's gubernatorial elections are held every in alternate (even-numbered) years, instead of every fourth year.

North Carolina

Mike Easley was term-limited in 2008, in another state whose governorship had been held by Democrats for 16 years. Democratic Lieutenant Governor Beverly Perdue was the Democratic nominee, defeating Charlotte Mayor Pat McCrory, the Republican nominee.

North Dakota

Republican John Hoeven announced he would seek re-election for a third term in 2008. He won re-election with 74% of the vote.  Soundly defeating the Democratic gubernatorial nominee, State Senator Tim Mathern, (24%) and independent candidate DuWayne Hendrickson (2%).

Utah

Jon Huntsman, Jr. was heavily favored to win re-election in Utah. As of 2008, Republicans had controlled the Utah governorship for 24 years. Democrat Bob Springmeyer challenged Huntsman, but was decisively defeated.

Vermont

Three-term incumbent Jim Douglas ran as a Republican, and House Speaker Gaye Symington ran as a Democrat. Other candidates included Anthony Pollina of the Vermont Progressive Party and Cris Ericson of the Marijuana Party. Douglas was re-elected.

Washington

Democrat Christine Gregoire is perhaps best known for having won in 2004 by 133 votes in the third official count, after having lost the initial count by 261 votes and the first recount by 24 votes. Her 2004 opponent, Republican former State Senator Dino Rossi, officially announced his candidacy on October 25, 2007. Pre-election SurveyUSA polls showed Gregoire leading Rossi with a 50% to 47% margin. A September 10 poll by Rasmussen Reports showed Rossi pulling ahead by a 52% to 46% margin. The race was expected to be extremely close, but Gregoire was reelected by a wider than expected margin of 6.45%.

West Virginia

Democrat Joe Manchin ran for re-election in West Virginia and was heavily favored according to pre-election polls. On November 4, he faced former State Senator Russ Weeks, a Republican, and Mountain Party candidate Jesse Johnson, who ran in 2004. Butch Paugh of the Constitution Party also attempted a run but failed to qualify for the ballot. Manchin won re-election by a landslide.

Territories

American Samoa

American Samoa's Togiola Tulafono sought re-election in 2008 with Lieutenant Governor Ipulasi Aitofele Sunia. He won his first term 55.7% to 44.3% in the 2004 run-off against Afoa Moega Lutu. Tulafono was again challenged by Afoa Moega Lutu and Velega Savali, who ran as a nonpartisan team for governor and lieutenant governor respectively. Utu Abe Malae and Tuika Tuika also ran to become the next Governor on separate, nonpartisan tickets. Tulafono won in a close vote that split three ways.

Puerto Rico

Aníbal Acevedo Vilá of Puerto Rico ran for a second term in 2008. In 2004, Acevedo narrowly beat former Governor and Senator Pedro Rosselló, also a Democrat, by a mere 3,566 votes.

Republican at-large Resident Commissioner Luis Fortuño, who announced in December 2006 that he would not again seek re-election to his current post, ran against him. There was also a movement to elect Senator Rosselló as a write-in choice for governor.

The Puerto Rican Independence Party's candidate was Edwin Irizarry Mora, while a fourth candidate, Rogelio Figueroa (Puerto Ricans for Puerto Rico Party), ran on an environmentalist platform.

Acevedo was defeated by Fortuño on election day. The federal indictment against Acevedo for alleged corruption schemes when he was in Congress, and generally low approval, may have been a drag on his candidacy and chances of winning re-election.

Overall results
At the 2008 Elections, all 55 governorships of the states and territories were occupied. However, in the 2008 election cycle, only thirteen seats were up for election - eleven were statewide, and two were territorial. Eight seats were held by Democrats, and the remaining five were held by Republicans.

See also
2008 United States elections
2008 United States presidential election
2008 United States Senate elections
2008 United States House of Representatives elections

References